Baldonnel is a townland in west County Dublin. It is an industrial/agricultural area near Clondalkin, Tallaght, Lucan, Saggart and Naas. It is around 15 km west of Dublin city centre.

The name derives from former landowners in the area; the earliest written record of the name comes from a 1717 deed for Baldonnell which lists alternate spellings of Baldownan, Balldonnan, and Ballydonnell. Two surviving local houses (the oldest to the north of the airfield, and the newest further east in the same area) claim the name Baldonnell House, and the ruins of the original house are located to the east of the airfield.

The River Camac flows through the townland before flowing by way of Corkagh Park to join the River Liffey.

See also 
 Casement Aerodrome, Irish Air Corps base

References 

Towns and villages in South Dublin (county)